The name Haiyan was used to name three tropical cyclones in the western north Pacific Ocean. The name was contributed by China and means petrel.

Typhoon Haiyan (2001) (T0121, 25W, Maring), hit Taiwan and the Ryukyu Islands
Tropical Storm Haiyan (2007) (T0716, 27W), a tropical cyclone initially showing subtropical characteristics
Typhoon Haiyan (2013) (T1330, 31W, Yolanda), an extremely powerful and deadly Category 5-equivalent super typhoon that caused catastrophic destruction in the Philippines

The name "Haiyan" was retired after the 2013 typhoon season and was replaced with "Bailu" in the 2019 season.

Pacific typhoon set index articles